Andrew Charles Gilchrist (born 5 December 1960) is a British trade unionist and former firefighter who served as the General Secretary of the Fire Brigades Union from 2000 to 2005.

Early life
Gilchrist was born the son of Edward and Shirley Gilchrist. He was educated at Bedford Modern School.

Career
Gilchrist started his career at the Bedfordshire and Luton Fire and Rescue Service, where he worked from 1979 until 1996. As a member of the Fire Brigades Union, he became a member of the executive council in 1993, a position he held until 2000. He was a national officer from 1996 to 2000 and General Secretary from 2000 to 2005, leading the FBU through the 2002-2003 UK firefighter dispute before he was voted out in favour of Matt Wrack in 2005.

Gilchrist was a Member of the General Council of the Trades Union Congress from 2000 to 2005 and a member of the International Brotherhood of Teamsters from 2006 to 2008. Since 2010 he has been the National Education Officer at the National Union of Rail, Maritime and Transport Workers.

Phone hacking scandal
Gilchrist was a victim of the News International phone hacking scandal.

Family life
Gilchrist married Loretta Borman in 1985 and they have a son (Alexander Mark Gilchrist) and a daughter (Scarlett Faye Gilchrist).

References

General Secretaries of the Fire Brigades Union
British firefighters
1960 births
Members of the General Council of the Trades Union Congress
People educated at Bedford Modern School
Living people